Vice-Admiral Granville George Waldegrave, 2nd Baron Radstock CB (24 September 1786 – 11 May 1857) was a British naval officer.

Early life

Radstock was born in London in 1786, the elder son of Admiral William Waldegrave, 1st Baron Radstock and his wife, Cornelia Jacoba van Lennep. He succeeded to the peerage upon the death of his father in 1825.

Royal Navy

Radstock joined the Royal Navy in 1798 and rose through the ranks, becoming a captain in 1807, rear admiral in 1841, vice admiral of the White in 1853 and the Red in 1855. 

From 1831-37, he was a Naval aide-de-camp to King William IV and to Queen Victoria from 1837–1841.

Marriage and children
On 7 August 1823, he married Esther Caroline Paget (1800–1874). They had three children:

 Hon Elizabeth Cornelia Waldegrave (born 1824, died 16 April 1903), unmarried.
 Hon Catherine Esther Waldegrave (born 24 May 1826, died 3 July 1898), married Sir Thomas Proctor-Beauchamp, 4th Baronet
 Granville Augustus William Waldegrave, 3rd Baron Radstock (born 10 April 1833, died 8 December 1913)

Honours
Radstock was made a Companion of the Order of the Bath (CB).

Death

Lord Radstock died in London in 1857, aged 70, and was succeeded in the peerage by his only son, Granville. He is buried on the western side of Highgate Cemetery above the Lebanon Circle.

Arms

See also

References

1786 births
1857 deaths
Burials at Highgate Cemetery
Barons in the Peerage of Ireland
Companions of the Order of the Bath
Royal Navy vice admirals
Granville Waldegrave, 2nd Baron Radstock
Royal Navy personnel of the Napoleonic Wars